La Victoria may refer to:

Places

Chile
La Victoria, Santiago

Colombia
La Victoria, Amazonas, a town and municipality
La Victoria, Boyacá, a town and municipality
La Victoria, Valle del Cauca, a town and municipality

Dominican Republic
 La Victoria, Dominican Republic

Mexico
 La Victoria, Veracruz in Catemaco Municipality

Paraguay
La Victoria District, Paraguay

Peru
 La Victoria District, Chiclayo
 La Victoria District, Lima

Spain
La Victoria, Córdoba, Spain
La Victoria de Acentejo, Santa Cruz de Tenerife, in the Canary Islands

United States
La Victoria, Texas

Venezuela
La Victoria, Apure
La Victoria, Aragua, a municipal seat in Aragua State

Other uses
 Battle of La Victoria (1812), in La Victoria, Aragua, Venezuela
 Battle of La Victoria (1814), in La Victoria, Aragua, Venezuela
 Church of La Victoria, Alcalá de los Gazules, Andalusia, Spain
 La Victoria (company), a Mexican food company
 La Victoria FC, former name of Belizean football club Nizhee Corozal

See also

 Victoria (disambiguation)
 The Victoria (disambiguation)